Alam Zeb (born 10 August 1930) is a Pakistani former middle-distance runner. He competed in the men's 800 metres at the 1952 Summer Olympics.

References

External links
 

1930 births
Possibly living people
Athletes (track and field) at the 1952 Summer Olympics
Pakistani male middle-distance runners
Olympic athletes of Pakistan
Place of birth missing (living people)